In Island of Exiles is a 2007 detective novel by I. J. Parker. The story follows Sugawara Akitada, who is assigned by two shadowy officials to investigate the fatal poisoning on penal colony on Sado Island of the exiled and disgraced Prince Okisada. The suspect is the son of the local governor, the officials thought he might have been framed as part of a treasonous plot. Akitada is forced to carry out an undercover investigation, taking on the guise of a convict sentenced to exile on the island. It becomes a perilous task, as the convicts on the island were treated "cheaper than dirt", expendable slaves to work the mines.

Locations covered in the novel
  : Sado Island in the Sea of Japan
  : Main port city and provincial capital on Sawata Bay.
  : Village by the Ogura River near the southern mountains, where Prince Okisada had his residence.
 Temple of the True Lotus : A Buddhist temple and monastery a mile up the mountain from Tsukahara.
 Echigo : Northern province of Japan, located in modern Niigata.  Known as "snow country".

Dramatis Personae
 Prince Okisada - an older brother of the current emperor. He was exiled after failing to overthrow the incumbent ruler.
 Taira Takamune - devoted tutor of Prince Okisada who followed him into exile.
 Professor Sakamoto - retired professor of classics.  He moved to Sado Island to write its history.
 Mutobe Toshikata - Governor of Sado Island.
 Mutobe Toshito - Son of the governor.
 Shunsei - A young Buddhist monk at the monastery of Temple of the True Lotus, and a lover of the prince.
 Yoshimine Taketsuna - New exile arrival at Sado.
 Jisei : Prisoner released from digging "badger holes".
 Haseo : Taciturn prisoner with a scarred back.  Not originally from the lower classes.
 Ogata : Alcoholic physician and coroner.
 Wada  : Local police authority.
 Yamada : Superintendent of the prison and "Valuables Office".
 Masako : Yamada's daughter, childhood beau of Toshito.
 Shijo Yukata : Head of the provincial archives.
 Genzo : A scribe at the archives.
 Ribata : A mysterious nun with a secret past.
 Osawa : Tax inspector.
 Kumo Sanetomo : Local landowner and appointed high constable of Sado island.
 Kita : Kumo's mine foreman.
 Takao : Landlady of Minato Inn who got Osawa's attention.
 Haru : Owner of lake restaurant named Bamboo Grove, famous for dishes from fresh catches by her husband.
 Nakatomi : Prince's physician.
 Taimai : Crippled porter.
 Oyoshi : Sister of Taimai, hostel keeper and mother of many children.
 Little Flower : Prostitute with stunted growth.
 Ikugoro : Wada's sergeant of constables.

External links
 I. J. Parker's Island of Exiles

2007 American novels
American detective novels
American historical novels
Novels set on islands
Niigata Prefecture
Novels set in Japan
Japan in non-Japanese culture